The 2017–18 season will be Fleetwood Town's 110th season in their history and fourth consecutive season in League One. Along with League One, the club will also participate in the FA Cup, EFL Cup and EFL Trophy.

The season covers the period from 1 July 2017 to 30 June 2018.

Transfers

Transfers in

Transfers out

Loans in

Loans out

Competitions

Friendlies
As of 9 June 2017, Fleetwood Town have confirmed five pre-season friendlies against Preston North End, Queen of the South, Bolton Wanderers, Tranmere Rovers, and Karlsruher SC.

League One

League table

Result summary

Results by matchday

Matches
On 21 June 2017, the league fixtures were announced.

FA Cup
On 16 October 2017, Fleetwood Town were drawn away to Chorley or Boston United in the first round. Chorley went on to win the replayed match to set up the first round tie. A home fixture against Hereford was confirmed for the second round.

EFL Cup
On 16 June 2017, Fleetwood Town were drawn at home to Carlisle United in the first round.

EFL Trophy

On 12 July 2017, the group stage draw was completed with Fleetwood facing Carlisle United, Leicester City U23s and Morecambe in Northern Group A. After topping their ground, Fleetwood were handed a home tie against Chesterfield in the second round. An away trip to Bury was announced for the third round.

References

Fleetwood Town F.C. seasons
Fleetwood Town